InMediaRes Productions, LLC is an American game company that produces role-playing games and game supplements.

History
In 2003, Loren L. Coleman created the company InMediaRes Productions, which he founded with Heather Coleman, Randall Bills, Tara Bills, and Philip DeLuca. InMediaRes received their licence for the electronic publication of Classic Battletech fiction from WizKids in the fall of 2003. They made an announcement that year at GenCon 36 and had their full website, BattleCorps.com, ready to go a year later in August 2004. InMediaRes kicked things off with the fiction of founders Bills and Coleman, and from there, month-by-month they continued with their electronic delivery model. InMediaRes announced their plans to create a similar "Holostreets" web site for Shadowrun fiction in 2005 but have not done so. Some of the fiction from the BattleCorps website has made it to print as Battletech Corps Vol. 1: The Corps (2008) and Battletech Corps Vol. 2: First Strike (2010) – following some changes to InMediaRes' licence in 2007 and 2008.

In 2007, Rob Boyle and Bills tried to buy FanPro LLC from Fantasy Productions, and when that did not work out WizKids stepped in to mediate; although they were not willing to let Boyle and Bills create a new company, they were willing to give the Battletech and Shadowrun licenses to InMediaRes. After acquiring the rights to both FASA games, InMediaRes took on Boyle and Bills as regular staff – which had been part of the agreement with WizKids. Boyle remained as the Shadowrun Line Editor for the next few years, while Bills became a Managing Director of InMediaRes. InMediaRes created a subsidiary to hold their new gaming rights: Catalyst Game Labs. InMediaRes placed a higher value on electronic material, and in 2007 started charging for Catalyst's Shadowrun releases.

Company information
InMediaRes Productions was founded in 2003 by Loren and Heather Coleman, Tara and Randall N. Bills and Philip DeLuca with the express purpose of licensing the rights to publish new, canon Classic BattleTech fiction to the Internet from WizKids.  Wizkids granted this license to IMR in the fall of 2003, which directly led to the creation of BattleCorps in August 2004.  In 2005, IMR announced its intentions to branch out into Shadowrun fiction and established Holostreets with the intention of doing for Shadowrun what had been done for BattleTech. IMR hopes to have Holostreets up and running by 2008.

On April 20, 2007, IMR announced that it was in negotiations with WizKids and FanPro to acquire the licenses for Classic BattleTech and Shadowrun, as FanPro's licenses were set to expire. On May 17, 2007, IMR announced the creation of Catalyst Game Labs in preparation for the acquisition of the licenses. As of mid-2007, Catalyst began releasing new sourcebooks for both lines.

Heather Coleman serves as IMR's executive manager, while Loren is the submissions editor for BattleCorps.

References

External links
 CatalystGameLabs.com
 
 BattleCorps.com

Companies based in Snohomish County, Washington
Privately held companies based in Washington (state)
Role-playing game publishing companies